The All England Open Badminton Championships is an annual British badminton tournament created in 1899. For four decades beginning 1954, the Championships was held at the Wembley Arena, London but since 1994, it has been played at the Arena Birmingham in the city of Birmingham, United Kingdom. The Gentlemen's Singles was first contested in 1900. Below is the list of the winners at the All England Open Badminton Championships in gentlemen's singles. The tournament was cancelled between 1915–1919 because of World War I, and between 1940–1946 because of World War II.

History
In the Amateur era, Rudy Hartono (1968–1974, 1976) holds the record for the most titles in the Gentlemen's Singles, winning All England eight times. Hartono also holds the record for most consecutive titles with seven from 1968 to 1974.

Since the Open era of badminton began in late 1979 with the inclusion of professional badminton players from around the world in 1980, Lin Dan (2004, 2006–2007, 2009, 2012, 2016) holds the record for the most Gentlemen's Singles titles with six. Morten Frost (1986–1987), Hariyanto Arbi (1993–1994), Poul-Erik Høyer Larsen (1995–1996), Lin Dan and Lee Chong Wei (2010–2011) share the record for most consecutive victories with just two.

This event was won without losing a single game in the entire tournament during the Open era as many as twelve times. The first to accomplish this was Prakash Padukone who won in the very first Open era edition in 1980, followed by Morten Frost in 1986 and 1987, Yang Yang in 1989, Poul-Erik Høyer Larsen in 1996, Sun Jun in 1998, Pullela Gopichand in 2001, Muhammad Hafiz Hashim in 2003, Chen Jin in 2008, Lin Dan in 2009 and 2012 and Lee Chong Wei in 2011.

Liem Swie King is the only player in history to reach the All England Open Badminton Gentlemen's Singles Final in both Amateur and Open era. He managed to do so seven times, winning on three occasions.

Finalists

Amateur era

Open era

Statistics

Multiple titles
Bold indicates active players.

Champions by country

Multiple finalists
Bold indicates active players.Italic indicates players who never won the championship.

Trivia
 In 1913 & 1914 Guy A. Sautter competed under the alias of U. N. Lapin and in 1920 George Thomas played under the alias of George Allen.
 Only nine players have ever contested at least five finals back-to-back, with six of the records taking place back-to-back themselves. However, only the latter four of those players have done so in the Open Era. Those who have accomplished this rare feat include Frank Devlin, immediately after George Alan Thomas, followed by Morten Frost succeeding Liem Swie King more than half a century after, and finally more than two decades later, the legendary duo of Lin Dan and Lee Chong Wei going down the same path: 

Bold indicates active players.

 The players who holds the record for most finals contested are Rudy Hartono and Lin Dan at 10.
 Between 2004 & 2018, either or both Lin Dan and Lee Chong Wei have contested the final of 14 of the 15 editions held, with the exception of the final in 2015, which saw Lin eliminated in the semi-finals and Lee unable to compete due to a doping ban.

See also
 List of All England women's singles champions
 List of All England men's doubles champions
 List of All England women's doubles champions
 List of All England mixed doubles champions

References

External links
All England Champions 1899-2007
BadmintonEngland.co.uk
badmintoneurope.com
Pat Davis: The Encyclopaedia of Badminton. Robert Hale, London, 1987, 

All England Open Badminton Championships